HMAS Assail (P 89) was an  of the Royal Australian Navy (RAN).

Design and construction

The Attack class was ordered in 1964 to operate in Australian waters as patrol boats (based on lessons learned through using the s on patrols of Borneo during the Indonesia-Malaysia Confrontation, and to replace a variety of old patrol, search-and-rescue, and general-purpose craft. Initially, nine were ordered for the RAN, with another five for Papua New Guinea's Australian-run coastal security force, although another six ships were ordered to bring the class to twenty vessels. Propulsion machinery consisted of two 16-cylinder Paxman YJCM diesel engines, which supplied  to the two propellers. The ship's company consisted of three officers and sixteen sailors. Main armament was a bow-mounted Bofors 40 mm gun, supplemented by two .50-calibre M2 Browning machine guns and various small arms. The ships were designed with as many commercial components as possible: the Attacks were to operate in remote regions of Australia and New Guinea, and a town's hardware store would be more accessible than home base in a mechanical emergency.

Assail was built by Evans Deakin and Company at Brisbane, Queensland, launched on 18 November 1967, and commissioned on 12 July 1968.

Operational history
Assail paid off on 18 October 1985, and was transferred to the Indonesian Navy and renamed KRI Sigurot (864). The patrol boat was listed in Jane's Fighting Ships as still operational in 2011.

Citations

References

Attack-class patrol boats
1967 ships